Euzko Gaztedi Indarra-EGI (Basque for "Basque Youth Force") is the youth wing of the Basque main nationalist political party, the Basque Nationalist Party (PNV). Their presence is in the Basque Country, in the Basque Autonomous Community, Navarre and in the Northern Basque Country. According to its statutes is defined as an organization Basque, democratic, pluralistic, participatory, independence and humanist wishing to achieve a framework of respect for the identity of peoples and human rights.

See also 

 Politics of France
 Politics of Spain
 Sabino Arana
 Carlism
 José Antonio Aguirre
 Ikurriña
 Eusko Abendaren Ereserkia

References

External links
 Official website of Euzko Gaztedi-EGI
 Web with various stickers EGI
 Videos of EGI
 Statutes of EGI
 Texts adopted by the Fourth bilera Nagusia of EGI

Youth wings of political parties in Spain
Basque nationalism
Organizations based in Northern Basque Country
Organizations established in 1904
Political parties in Navarre